Gustavo Carvajal (born 17 June 2000) is a Colombian football player who plays as midfielder for América de Cali.

A native of Cauca Department, Carvajal began playing club football with América de Cali. Former goalkeeping coach Otoniel Quintana brought Carvajal to América. He made his competitive debut for the club in February 2018, before joining Levante UD's B team on loan in July 2020.

References

External links

2000 births
Living people
Sportspeople from Cauca Department
Colombian footballers
Association football midfielders
Categoría Primera A players
América de Cali footballers
Segunda División B players
Atlético Levante UD players
Colombian expatriate footballers
Colombian expatriate sportspeople in Spain
Expatriate footballers in Spain
Colombia youth international footballers
Colombia under-20 international footballers